Valeria Erepta Brinton Young (December 13, 1875 - October 22, 1968) was an American educator, president of the Women of the University of Utah.

Early life
Valeria Erepta Brinton was born on December 13, 1875, in Cottonwood, Utah, the daughter of LDS Bishop David Branson Brinton (1850–1929) and Susan Erepta Huffaker (1854–1916).

Brinton attended the University of Utah, graduating as valedictorian in June 1895.

Career
On April 1, 1927, Valeria Brinton Young was elected a member of the State Board of Health and Vital Statistics. She was also secretary of the Utah Anti-Tuberculosis Society.

Young was president of Women of the University of Utah and a member of the Executive Board of the State Federation of Women's Clubs. She was president of the Author's Club and of the Mission Relief Society Organization.

Young was a member of: Service Star Legion, Republican Women's Club, League of Women Voters, Ensign Club, the Young Ladies' Mutual Improvement Association.

President of the Women's State Legislative Council of Utah 1929 to 1933

Personal life
On June 12, 1907, Valeria Brinton married Levi Edgar Young (1874–1963), the son of Seymour B. Young and one of the first seven presidents of Seventies. They had 3 children: Harriet Wollerton (1909-2006, later Kline), Jane Seymour (1911-2004, later Rawson), Eleanor Brinton (1913-2008, later Van Orden).

Young lived at 555 East South Temple, Salt Lake City, Utah.

In 1910, the family moved temporarily to New York City, to allow Levi Young to study at Columbia University for his master's degree in history.

Young died on October 22, 1968, and is buried at Wasatch Lawn Memorial Park, Salt Lake City.

Gallery

References

1875 births
1968 deaths
American Latter Day Saint writers
American suffragists
University of Utah alumni
American women's rights activists
Relief Society people
Mormon feminists
American leaders of the Church of Jesus Christ of Latter-day Saints
People from Holladay, Utah
Latter Day Saints from Utah
20th-century American women politicians
20th-century American politicians
Members of the League of Women Voters